Partula jackieburchi was a species of tropical, air-breathing land snail, a terrestrial, pulmonate, gastropod mollusk in the family Partulidae.

This species was endemic to Tahiti, Society Islands, French Polynesia.

Taxonomy
The taxonomy of this species has changed several times and remains unclarified and disputed. It has been recombined as Partula jackieburchi and in 1986 was referred to as Partula otaheitana rubescens.

Extinction
This species is believed to have become extinct after the introduction of the carnivorous wolf snail to Tahiti in 1977.  No living individuals were found during searches in the 1980s and the 1990s.  In 2003-2005, an extensive survey was conducted on Tahiti Nui, and no living specimens of this species were found.

References

 Gerlach J. (2016). Icons of evolution: Pacific Island tree-snails of the family Partulidae. Phelsuma Press. 

J
Extinct gastropods
Extinct animals of Oceania
Fauna of French Polynesia
Molluscs of Oceania
Taxonomy articles created by Polbot
Taxobox binomials not recognized by IUCN
Gastropods described in 1980